Charles Dick (31 January 1902 – 10 June 1969) was a South African cricketer. He played in one first-class match for Border in 1927/28.

See also
 List of Border representative cricketers

References

External links
 

1902 births
1969 deaths
South African cricketers
Border cricketers
Cricketers from East London, Eastern Cape